The Christmas Tree is a 1966 British children's adventure film about getting a Christmas tree to a London hospital for Christmas. It follows their escapades such as the difficulties in getting the tree inside a public bus, on the back of a jeep, and carrying it through villages and rescuing it from a river. Directed by Jim Clark and written by Ed Harper and Michael Barnes, it stars William Burleigh, Kate Nicholls and Anthony Honour, with an early role for Brian Blessed as a policeman.

Plot
A trio of children are given the task of transporting a Christmas tree to a London hospital for Christmas. They narrowly manage to get it onto a bus, much to the disdain of other passengers and then it is carried on the back of a jeep while they hitch a ride on a motorcycle. They carry it through rural villages, and accidentally drop it in a river, leading them to rescue it. They hitch a ride in an American car, which turns out to be driven by robbers. Hearing a description of them over the radio, the children disperse the stolen money out the back door window while travelling through a village, leading to their arrest. The Christmas tree finds itself on a tank on military property, 30 miles from London before finally reaching its destination thanks to an army bus of soldiers and a truck.

The film ends at St Vincent's Hospital with the children and a bespectacled Santa singing carols by the repaired and now well-decorated tree.

References

1966 films
British children's adventure films
1960s British films